Cone Hill is a hill  northeast of Castle Rock on Hut Point Peninsula, Ross Island. The descriptive name Cone Hill I was used by the British Antarctic Expedition, 1910–13 under Robert Falcon Scott, but the form Cone Hill has come into general use.

References 

Hills of Ross Island